Takhtgah-e Hoseyn Soltan (also Romanized as Takhtgāh-e Ḩoseyn Solţān; also known as Takhtgāh-e Ḩoseynī) is a village in Gurani Rural District, Gahvareh District, Dalahu County, Kermanshah Province, Iran. At the 2006 census, its population was 253, in 57 families.

References 

Populated places in Dalahu County